Mahvish Rukhsana Khan (born July 8, 1978) is a Pashtun-American lawyer and writer.

She graduated from the University of Michigan with a Bachelor of Arts in Political Science and Government and from the University of Miami School of Law with a Juris Doctor.

While still in law school at the University of Miami, Khan, who speaks Pashto, and whose parents are Pashtun, worked as an interpreter for defense attorneys representing detainees held at Guantanamo Bay detention camp.  After visiting the military base, she wrote of her experiences in The Washington Post in 2006. That article was later expanded into a book, My Guantanamo Diary: The Detainees and the Stories They Told me, published in 2008 by PublicAffairs.

On February 25, 2010, the Daily Times published an excerpt from her book, where she describes meeting Ali Shah Mousovi – the first captive she met.
She reported being told of serious abuse by Mousavi, including week of confinement in a coffin-sized box, beatings, stress positions, and being soaked with freezing cold water.

Khan is now providing supervised legal counsel for one Afghan detainee at Guantanamo.

References

External links
Mahvish Rukhsana Khan's website

1978 births
Living people
Pashtun women
American women writers
University of Miami School of Law alumni
University of Michigan alumni
Guantanamo Bay attorneys
American people of Pakistani descent
American people of Pashtun descent
21st-century American women lawyers
21st-century American lawyers